Ruth Álvarez Bela (born 5 June 2000) is a Spanish professional footballer who plays as a left back for Liga F club Madrid CFF.

Early life
Álvarez was born in Palma de Mallorca to a Spanish father and an Equatorial Guinean Bubi mother.

Club career
Álvarez is the youngest player to appear in Primera División, when she debuted for Collerense aged 15 years and 100 days at the 2015–16 Primera División.

International career
Álvarez is not capped for Spain, but has represented the Balearic Islands women's autonomous football team at under-12, under-16 and under-18 levels. She has also appeared with the Majorca women's local football team at under-13, under-16 and under-18 levels.

In January 2016, Álvarez has had a met with members of the then technical staff of the Equatorial Guinea national football team.

On 29 November 2021, Álvarez played for Spain at under-23 level. She remains eligible to play for Equatorial Guinea.

Personal life
Álvarez has been in a relationship with Japanese footballer Tomo Matsukawa, who was her teammate at Eibar.

References

External links
Profile at BDFutbol

2000 births
Living people
Footballers from Palma de Mallorca
Spanish women's footballers
Women's association football fullbacks
UD Collerense (women) players
SD Eibar Femenino players
Madrid CFF players
Primera División (women) players
Segunda Federación (women) players
Spanish sportspeople of Equatoguinean descent
Spanish people of Bubi descent
LGBT association football players
Spanish LGBT sportspeople